Le Rocquier School is a secondary school, owned and operated by the States of Jersey, and located in the parish of St Clement in Jersey.

History
The present school building, which replaced an older building, was opened to students on 29 February 2006.

Academic performance
In 2011 28% of pupils achieved A* - C GCSE in five subjects, compared to 58% in all Jersey schools and 53% for all UK schools. Some other Jersey schools, such as Grainville School, also performed poorly that year. Other independent schools in Jersey performed much better.

Notable alumni
Kurtis Guthrie
Serena Guthrie

See also
 List of schools in Jersey

References

External links

Schools in Jersey
Saint Clement, Jersey
Secondary schools in the Channel Islands